An invoice, bill or tab is a commercial document issued by a seller to a buyer relating to a sale transaction and indicating the products, quantities, and agreed-upon prices for products or services the seller had provided the buyer.

Payment terms are usually stated on the invoice. These may specify that the buyer has a maximum number of days to pay and is sometimes offered a discount if paid before the due date. The buyer could have already paid for the products or services listed on the invoice. To avoid confusion and consequent unnecessary communications from buyer to seller, some sellers clearly state in large and capital letters on an invoice whether it has already been paid.

From a seller's point of view, an invoice is a sales invoice. From a buyer's point of view, an invoice is a purchase invoice. The document indicates the buyer and seller, but the term invoice indicates money is owed or owing.

Within the European Union, an invoice is primarily legally defined by the EU VAT directive as an accounting voucher (to verify tax and VAT reporting) and secondly as a Civil law (common law) document.

An invoice should not be mixed up with Proforma Invoice that indicates commitment, intention, or prepayment request.

History 

Invoices appear as one of the very earliest manifestations of written records in ancient Mesopotamia.

Invoices

'A typical invoice may contain:
 The word invoice (or tax invoice);
 A unique reference number (in case of correspondence about the invoice);
 Date of the invoice;
 Credit terms;
 Tax amounts, if relevant (e.g., GST or VAT);
 Name and contact details of the seller;
 Tax or company registration details of the seller, if relevant, e.g. ABN for Australian businesses or VAT number for businesses in the EU;
 Name and contact details of the buyer;
 Date of sending or delivery of the goods or service;
 Purchase-order number (or similar tracking numbers requested by the buyer to be mentioned on the invoice);
 Description of the product(s);
 Unit price(s) of the product(s), if relevant;
 Total amount charged with currency (symbol or abbreviation);
 Payment terms (including one or more acceptable methods of payment, date the payment is expected, and details about charges for late payments, i.e. payments made after this date);
 Advanced details (including vehicle no, LR no., LR date, mode of transport, net weight, gross weight, tare weight, out time, freight type, driver name, drive contact no. etc.)

In countries where wire transfer is the preferred method of settling debts, the printed bill will contain the bank account number of the creditor and usually a reference code to be passed along with the transaction identifying the payer.

The US Defense Logistics Agency requires an employer identification number on invoices.

The European Union requires a VAT (value-added tax) identification number for official VAT invoices, which all VAT-registered businesses are required to issue to their customers. In the UK, this number may be omitted on invoices if the words "this is not a VAT invoice" are present on the invoice. Such an invoice is called a pro-forma invoice, and is not an adequate substitute for a full VAT invoice for VAT-registered customers.

In Canada, the registration number for GST purposes must be furnished for all supplies over $30 made by a registered supplier in order to claim input tax credits.

Recommendations about invoices used in international trade are also provided by the UNECE Committee on Trade, which involves a more detailed description of the logistics aspect of merchandise and, therefore may be convenient for international logistics and customs procedures.

European Union
EU VAT union invoice definition

Within the European Union Value Added Tax directive, Article 226 gives a concise definition of invoices within the European Union's member-states.

Without prejudice to the particular provisions laid down in this Directive, only the following details are required for VAT purposes on invoices issued pursuant to Articles 220 and 221:

 the date of issue;
 a sequential number, based on one or more series, which uniquely identifies the invoice;
 the VAT identification number referred to in Article 214 under which the taxable person supplied the goods or services;
 the customer's VAT identification number, as referred to in Article 214, under which the customer received a supply of goods or services in respect of which he is liable for payment of VAT, or received a supply of goods as referred to in Article 138;
 the full name and address of the taxable person and of the customer;
 the quantity and nature of the goods supplied or the extent and nature of the services rendered;
 the date on which the supply of goods or services was made or completed or the date on which the payment on account referred to in points (4) and (5) of Article 220 was made, in so far as that date can be determined and differs from the date of issue of the invoice;
 where the VAT becomes chargeable at the time when the payment is received in accordance with Article 66(b) and the right of deduction arises at the time the deductible tax becomes chargeable, the mention ‘cash accounting’;
 the taxable amount per rate or exemption, the unit price exclusive of VAT and any discounts or rebates if they are not included in the unit price;
 the VAT rate applied;
 the VAT amount payable, except where a special arrangement is applied under which, in accordance with this Directive, such a detail is excluded;
 where the customer receiving the supply issues the invoice (instead of the supplier) the mention 'self-billing';
 in the case of an exemption, reference to the applicable provision of this Directive, or to the corresponding national provision, or any other reference indicating that the supply of goods or services is exempt;
 where the customer is liable for the payment of the VAT, the mention 'reverse charge';
 in the case of the supply of a new means of transport made in accordance with the conditions specified in Article 138(1) and (2)(a), the characteristics as identified in point (b) of Article 2(2);
 where the margin scheme for travel agents is applied, the mention 'margin scheme – travel agents';
 where one of the special arrangements applicable to second-hand goods, works of art, collectors' items and antiques is applied, the mention 'margin scheme – second-hand goods'; 'margin scheme – works of art' or 'margin scheme – collector's items and antiques' respectively;
 where the person liable for payment of VAT is a tax representative for the purposes of Article 204, the (VAT identification number, referred to in Article 214, of that tax representative, together with his full name and address.

EU VAT union receipt (simple invoice) definition
Article 226b of the EU VAT Directive is a concise definition of receipts within the EU member-states.

As regards simplified invoices issued pursuant to Article 220a and Article 221(1) and (2), Member States shall require at least the following details:

 the date of issue;
 identification of the taxable person supplying the goods or services (VAT identification number);
 identification of the type of goods or services supplied;
 the VAT amount payable or the information needed to calculate it;
 where the invoice issued is a document or message treated as an invoice pursuant to Article 219, specific and unambiguous reference to that initial invoice and the specific details which are being amended.

They may not require details on invoices other than those referred to in Articles 226, 227 and 230.

Australian Tax Office Tax invoice definition

Details about the Australian Tax Office (ATO) requirements for a tax invoice can be found on their website.How to set out tax invoices and invoices 

For all GST purposes, a seller must issue a tax invoice to the buyer regardless of whether the sale involves cash or credit. Hence a tax invoice in Australia serves as an invoice as well as a receipt in the conventional sense. The words "paid" or "payable" differentiate meaning. The tax invoice must contain seven facts as per the GST Tax Law.

Variations
There are different types of invoices:

 Pro forma invoice – In foreign trade, a pro forma invoice is a document that states a commitment from the seller to provide specified goods to the buyer at specific prices. It is often used to declare value for customs. It is not an actual invoice, and thus the seller does not record a pro forma invoice as an account receivable and the buyer does not record a pro forma invoice as an account payable. A pro forma invoice is not issued by the seller until the seller and buyer have agreed to the terms of the order. In a few cases, a pro forma invoice is issued to request advance payments from the buyer, either to allow production to start or for security of the goods produced.
 Credit memo - If the buyer returns the goods, the seller usually issues a credit memo for the same or lower amount than the invoice, and then refunds the money to the buyer, or the buyer can apply that credit memo to another invoice.
 Commercial invoice - a customs declaration form used in international trade that describes the parties involved in the shipping transaction, the goods being transported, and the value of the goods. It is the primary document used by customs, and must meet specific customs requirements, such as the Harmonized System number and the country of manufacture. It is used to calculate tariffs.
 Debit memo - When a company fails to pay or short-pays an invoice, it is common practice to issue a debit memo for the balance and any late fees owed. In function, debit memos are identical to invoices.
 Self-billing invoice - A self billing invoice'' is used when a buyer issues the invoice to themselves (e.g. according to the consumption levels he is taking out of a vendor-managed inventory stock). The buyer (i.e. the issuer) should treat the invoice as an account payable and the seller should treat it as an account receivable. If there is tax on the sale, e.g. VAT or GST, then the buyer and seller may need to adjust their tax accounts in accordance with tax legislation. Under Article 224 of the EU VAT Directive, self-billing processes may only be used "if there is a prior agreement between the two parties and provided that a procedure exists for the acceptance of each invoice" by the supplier. A Self-Billing Agreement will usually provide for the supplier not to issue their own sales invoices as well.
 Evaluated receipt settlement (ERS) - ERS is a process of paying for goods and services from a packing slip rather than from a separate invoice document. The payee uses data in the packing slip to apply for the payments. "In an ERS transaction, the supplier ships goods based upon an Advance Shipping Notice (ASN), and the purchaser, upon receipt, confirms the existence of a corresponding purchase order or contract, verifies the identity and quantity of the goods, and then pays the supplier."
 Timesheet - Invoices for hourly services issued by businesses such as lawyers and consultants often pull data from a timesheet. A timesheet invoice may also be generated by Operated equipment rental companies where the invoice will be a combination of timesheet based charges and equipment rental charges.
 Statement - A periodic customer statement includes opening balance, invoices, payments, credit memos, debit memos, and ending balance for the customer's account during a specified period. A monthly statement can be used as a summary invoice to request a single payment for accrued monthly charges.
 Progress billing used to obtain partial payment on extended contracts, particularly in the construction industry (see Schedule of values)
 Collective Invoicing is also known as monthly invoicing in Japan. Japanese businesses tend to have many orders with small amounts because of the outsourcing system (Keiretsu), or of demands for less inventory control (Kanban). To save the administration work, invoicing is normally processed on monthly basis.
Continuation or Recurring Invoicing is standard within the equipment rental industry, including tool rental. A recurring invoice is one generated on a cyclical basis during the lifetime of a rental contract. For example, if you rent an excavator from 1 January to 15 April, on a calendar monthly arrears billing cycle, you would expect to receive an invoice at the end of January, another at the end of February, another at the end of March and a final Off-rent invoice would be generated at the point when the asset is returned. The same principle would be adopted if you were invoiced in advance, or if you were invoiced on a specific day of the month.
Electronic Invoicing is not necessarily the same as EDI invoicing. Electronic invoicing in its widest sense embraces EDI as well as XML invoice messages as well as other formats such as pdf. Historically, other formats such as pdf were not included in the wider definition of an electronic invoice because they were not machine readable and the process benefits of an electronic message could not be achieved. However, as data extraction techniques have evolved and as environmental concerns have begun to dominate the business case for the implementation of electronic invoicing, other formats are now incorporated into the wider definition.

Electronic
Some invoices are no longer paper-based, but rather transmitted electronically over the Internet. It is still common for electronic remittance or invoicing to be printed in order to maintain paper records. Standards for electronic invoicing vary widely from country to country. Electronic Data Interchange (EDI) standards such as the United Nation's EDIFACT standard include message encoding guidelines for electronic invoices. The EDIFACT is followed up in the UN/CEFACT ebXML syntax cross industry invoice.

EDIFACT
The United Nations standard for electronic invoices ("INVOIC") includes standard codes for transmitting header information (common to the entire invoice) and codes for transmitting details for each of the line items (products or services). The "INVOIC" standard can also be used to transmit credit and debit memos.

In the European Union legislation was passed in 2010 in the form of directive 2010/45/EU to facilitate the growth of Electronic Invoicing across all its member states. This legislation caters for varying VAT and inter-country invoicing requirements within the EU, in addition to legislating for the authenticity and integrity of invoices being sent electronically. It is estimated that in 2011 alone roughly 5 million EU businesses will have sent Electronic Invoices.

Open Application Group Integration Specification from OAGi
The XML message format for electronic invoices has been used since the inception of XML in 1998. Open Application Group Integration Specification (OAGIS) has included an invoice since 2001. The Open Applications Group (OAGi) has a working relationship with UN/CEFACT where OAGi and its members participate in defining many of the Technology and Methodology specifications. OAGi also includes support for these Technology and Methodology specifications within OAGIS.

CEFACT and UBL

There are two XML-based standards currently being developed. One is the cross industry invoice under development by the United Nations standards body UN/CEFACT and the other is Universal Business Language (UBL) which is issued by Organization for the Advancement of Structured Information Standards (OASIS). Implementations of invoices based on UBL are common, most importantly in the public sector in Denmark as it was the first country where the use of UBL was mandated by law for all invoices in the public sector. Further implementations are underway in the Scandinavian countries as result of the North European Subset project. Implementations are also underway in Italy, Spain, and the Netherlands (UBL 2.0) and with the European Commission itself.

The NES work has been transferred to European Committee for Standardization (CEN), the standards body of the European Union), workshop CEN/BII, for public procurement in Europe. The result of that work is PEPPOL. There UBL procurement documents are implemented between various European countries.

An agreement was made between UBL and UN/CEFACT for convergence of the two XML messages standards with the objective of merging the two standards into one before end of 2009, including the provision of an upgrade path for implementations started in either standard.

ISDOC
ISDOC is a standard that was developed in the Czech Republic as a universal format for electronic invoices. On 16 October 2008, 14 companies and the Czech government signed a declaration to use this format within one year in their products.

E-invoicing
After implantation of the GST in India, concept of e-invoicing has been introduced for reporting of Business to Business (B2B) invoices for notified category of taxpayer. As of now, B2C invoices are exempt from e-invoicing. 

However Dynamic QR is introduced for B2C. It is based on 'scan and pay' system. GSTN has introduced e-invoice registration services in collaboration with private IRPs including ClearTax, Cygnet, E&Y, and IRIS Business Ltd. Taxpayers can now register their e-invoices with numerous IRPs, which will increase GST reporting accuracy and simplify compliance. Instabill software can be used by business proprietors to generate instant e-invoices.

Payment
Organizations purchasing goods and services usually have a process in place for approving payment of invoices based on an employee's confirmation that the goods or services have been received.

Typically, when paying an invoice, a remittance advice will be sent to the supplier to inform them their invoice has been paid.

Standardization
Invoices and receipts can technically be produced from the same book. Or computerised record system. 

As a receipt where the customer has paid the complete bill could be called a zero balance invoice as there is $0.00 to pay. 

And an invoice were there is money to pay will be called an invoice for Xx amount.  

Invoice example.       
        Sub Total $356.08
        Tax.       $23.73   
        Total     $379.81

If the customer then pays the invoice a new record in the same book is made for the payment. It will be entered as

                 -$379.81
Bringing the temporary customer account to zero. This record is the same as a receipt for payment. On a trade account one doesn’t always send the customer a receipt (after subsequent payment) this record is often done in the background in a computerised record system. (As the customer all ready has the invoice for their records.  

Some receipts will be formatted 

(receipt)
Example;  sub total $5.95
          Tax.      $0.39
          Total     $6.34
      Payment cash. $6.34
      Balance due.  $0.00

Invoice finance
Invoice credit is a line of business credit secured by customer invoices.

See also
 Australian Business Number
 Bill of lading
 Cash collection
 Commercial invoice
 Document automation
 Dunning
 List of accounting roles
 Order (business)
 Order fulfillment
 Receipt
 :Category:Financial regulation

References

External links

 COUNCIL DIRECTIVE 2006/112/EC of 28 November 2006 on the common system of value added tax (merge revision version of 1 july 2013)

Accounting source documents
Business terms